Boaz Theofilius Erwin Solossa (born 16 March 1986) is an Indonesian professional footballer who plays as a forward for Liga 2 club Persipura Jayapura, on loan from Liga 1 club PSS Sleman. He is known for his efficient dribbling technique, shooting accuracy, and left-foot passing.

Personal life
Boaz was born in the Solossa family, a well-known family in the province of West Papua. His uncle, Jaap Solossa, was the governor of Papua before he died in 2005. Boaz was born in a footballing family as well, being the youngest of five children. Almost all of them were professionals, including his brother Ortizan and Nehemia. Boaz obtained a Bachelor of Economics at Cenderawasih University in 2013. He also works as civil servant.

Club career

Early career
Boaz began his junior career by playing at the amateur club PS Putra Yohan in 1999 to 2000. Then he moved to Perseru Serui from 2000 to 2001.

Boaz was summoned in the Papua PON Team to be competed in the 16th National Sports Week in Indonesia. At that time, he was only 17 years old. His talent finally came to Peter Withe, the coach of the Indonesian National Team at the time, and took him to the 2004 Tiger Cup when he was 18 years old.

Persipura Jayapura
Boaz signed his first professional contract with Persipura Jayapura in 2005. Since then, he has emerged as the most influential player at the club and even served as captain of the team after the departure of Eduard Ivakdalam.

Until 10 August, Boaz scored 207 goals from 311 official matches with Persipura and made him the club's all-time top scorer along with various individual awards. In addition, he also brought Persipura to win the top division of Indonesia's professional football league four times in the 2005, 2009, 2011 and 2013 seasons.

He has never strengthened other clubs in Indonesia other than Persipura despite being offered a higher salary from rival clubs. According to him, Persipura was like a second home for him and had become his extended family. But when Indonesia's professional football competition was halted due to FIFA sanctions from 2015 to 2016, he accepted an offer from Borneo FC to play in a non-official tournament because Persipura decided to temporarily disband. At the beginning of the 2018 season, he returned to play for Borneo FC only for the 2018 Presidential Cup pre-season tournament.

In July 2021, Boaz and teammate Yustinus Pae were released by Persipura, due to disciplinary issues.
Boaz has made 359 appearances and scored 225 goals in all competitions for Persipura.

East Timor
In 2016 Boaz was loaned by Persipura for the first time in his career to play for Carsae FC in East Timor after the conditions of Indonesian football at that time were being vacuumed due to FIFA sanctions, joining fellow Indonesians Imanuel Wanggai and Oktovianus Maniani. However, in April 2016 having only made four appearances Boaz along with Wanggai left the club by mutual consent to rejoin Persipura.

Borneo
After spending 16 years with Persipura, On 17 July 2021 Boaz joined Borneo on a 2-season deal. On 10 September 2021, Boaz made his debut for Borneo on a league game against Persik Kediri coming on as a substitute in the 70th-minute, as his team lose 1-0. On 8 January 2022, Boaz scored his first goal for Borneo against Persik Kediri at the Kapten I Wayan Dipta Stadium, Gianyar.

International career

The first time he appeared was dubbed the "prodigy", when he was brought by Peter Withe and performed a stunning performance in Ho Chi Minh City, when he performed with the Indonesian National Team in the 2004 Tiger Cup. Boaz's international debut was against Turkmenistan on 30 March 2004 for the 2006 World Cup qualification where Indonesia won 3–1 and Boaz made two assists for his teammate Ilham Jaya Kesuma. Boaz was considered to be a bright prospect in Indonesian football after performing brilliantly in the 2004 Tiger Cup, where Indonesia was defeated by Singapore in a home and away match, which resulted in an aggregate score of 5–2 to Singapore. In the group phase, Boaz managed to score 4 goals and along with Ilham Jayakesuma, who scored 7 goals, both led the top scorers chart.

He was injured after a tough tackle in a friendly match against Hong Kong, forcing him to miss the Asian Cup 2007 and disappear from football for 10 months.

After another failure for the Indonesian national team to become a champion in the 2016 AFF Championship, Boaz announce his retirement from the national squad to give chance to other young players as well admitting he was "tired to see Indonesia without any trophy in the tournament". He congratulate Thailand for their fifth trophy and acknowledged that "Thai players and their performances are much better and still far from us to reach". However, Boaz still disclosed his intention to retire, saying he wanted to discuss the matter with his family first while celebrating Christmas in his hometown of Sorong.

Career statistics

Club

National team

International goals

Boaz Solossa: International under-23 goals

Honours

Indonesia
Indonesian Independence Cup: 2008
AFF Championship runner-up: 2004, 2016

Persipura Jayapura
 Liga Indonesia: 2005
 Indonesia Super League: 2008–09, 2010–2011, 2013
 Indonesian Community Shield: 2009
 Indonesian Inter Island Cup: 2011
 Indonesia Soccer Championship A: 2016

Individual
 PON Top Scorer: 2004
 ISL Top Scorer: 2008–09, 2010–11, 2013
 ISL Player of the Year: 2008–09, 2010–11, 2013
 ISC A Best player: 2016 
 Indonesia Soccer Championship A Best XI: 2016
 2016 AFF Championship: Best Eleven
 ASEAN Football Federation Best XI: 2017 Favourite Athlete : Anugerah Olahraga Indonesia (AORI) XXIX: 2017
AFC Cup  All-time XI: Wide midfielders (2021)Record'''
 First Indonesian in list of FourFourTwo 50 Best Asian Football Player (2017)

References

External links
 

1986 births
Living people
Papuan people
Indonesian Christians
Indonesian footballers
People from Sorong
Indonesia international footballers
Indonesia youth international footballers
Indonesian Premier Division players
Liga 1 (Indonesia) players
Indonesian Super League-winning players
Persipura Jayapura players
Borneo F.C. players
PSS Sleman players
Indonesian expatriate sportspeople in East Timor
Expatriate footballers in East Timor
Indonesian expatriate footballers
Association football forwards
Cenderawasih University alumni
Papuan sportspeople
People from West Papua (province)